Ahmaed Hassan alias Imran is a veteran journalist and was a MP of Rajya Sabha from West Bengal, India. He had sworn into the parliament on 9 June 2014. In April 2017, he was selected as the Chairman for the Telephone Advisory Committees by the Govt. of India.

Early life 
Imran was born in the Mal police station area of Jalpaiguri district in West Bengal.

Ahmed Hassan Imran is a well known Bengali Journalist. Like the popular Malayalam daily Madhyamam from Muslim community in Kerala, the Bangla daily Qalam has too consolidated its foothold under his stewardship in West Bengal. Started 30 years ago as a monthly, turned into a weekly after some years, Qalam has emerged as the best and the most popular daily since 2012 with a large circulation in the Bengali community. Due to his popularity and successful venture of the Bangla daily, he was nominated a Member of Rajya Sabha by All India Trinamool Congress in 2014.

Born in the Mal police station area of Jalpaiguri district, he obtained his education from his native place. Since his student days, he remained active among students and youth and earned a reputation of a popular leader in Bengali community. It is a fact that there was no dearth of efforts for a Bangla newspaper from the Bengali Muslim community since even before Independence, but his Qalam, evolved from a monthly into a daily, fulfilled the long due need of the community. It is read by the entire Bengali community, irrespective of religion, due to its objective, non-partisan and universal approach.

References

Living people
Rajya Sabha members from West Bengal
Journalists from West Bengal
Year of birth missing (living people)
Place of birth missing (living people)
Trinamool Congress politicians from West Bengal